The Central District of Ganaveh County is in Bushehr province, Iran. At the 2006 census, its population was 70,110 in 14,940 households. The following census in 2011 counted 77,030 people in 19,013 households. At the latest census in 2016, the district had 88,649 inhabitants living in 24,181 households.

References 

Districts of Bushehr Province
Populated places in Ganaveh County